Anwarul Kabir Talukdar (1 January 1944 – 10 May 2020) was a politician of Bangladesh Nationalist Party and Liberal Democratic Party. He was a Jatiya Sangsad member representing the Jamalpur-4 constituency and State Minister of Power.

Career
Talukdar served in Bangladesh Army and retired as a major general. He was elected to parliament from Jamalpur-4. He was the State Minister for Planning and Finance, and later served as the State Minister of Power in the Second Khaleda Cabinet. He resigned his post to protest corruption in the power sector. The Bangladesh Nationalist Party government reported that he had not resigned but in fact had been sacked from his ministerial post by the government.

Talukdar resigned from Bangladesh Nationalist Party on 26 October 2006. According to him, he resigned to protest the corruption in the Power sector of Bangladesh under the Bangladesh Nationalist Party government. He joined the Liberal Democratic Party (LDP) formed that year by him, AQM Badruddoza Chowdhury and Oli Ahmed. He resigned from LDP on 5 January 2009.

Personal life
Talukdar was the nephew of Abdus Salam Talukder (1936–1999), a former minister and a secretary general of Bangladesh Nationalist Party.

Death
Talukdar died on 10 May 2020 from COVID-19.

References

2020 deaths
Bangladesh Nationalist Party politicians
8th Jatiya Sangsad members
Bangladesh Army generals
State Ministers of Power, Energy and Mineral Resources
State Ministers of Planning (Bangladesh)
State Ministers of Finance (Bangladesh)
Deaths from the COVID-19 pandemic in Bangladesh
1944 births